Bascule may refer to:
 Bascule bridge, a moveable bridge with a counterweight that continuously balances the span in providing clearance for boat traffic
 Bascule (horse), the arc a horse's body takes as it goes over a jump
 Bascule light, a small navigational aid popular in Denmark up to the 18th century
 Cecal bascule, a cause of large bowel obstruction
 Teeterboard, a circus apparatus
 Bascule the Teller, a character from the 1994 Iain M. Banks novel Feersum Endjinn